The 1967 Delaware State Hornets football team represented Delaware State College—now known as Delaware State University—as a member of the Central Intercollegiate Athletic Association (CIAA) in the 1967 NCAA College Division football season. Led by first-year head coach Arnold Jeter, the Hornets compiled an overall record of 2–6–1 and a mark of 2–3–1 in conference play, placing ninth in the CIAA.

Schedule

References

Delaware State
Delaware State Hornets football seasons
Delaware State Hornets football